Schmoll can refer to:

People
 Betty Schmoll (1936–2015), American nurse
 George Schmoll (1870–1942), New Zealand cricketer
 Hazel Schmoll (1890–1990), American botanist
 Steve Schmoll (born 1980), American baseball pitcher
 Tim Schmoll (born 1993), Swiss footballer

Other
 6295 Schmoll,  an asteroid
 Schmoll, the main nickname of French singer Eddy Mitchell
 Schmoll's milkvetch, a plant (Astragalus schmolliae)

See also
 Peter Schmoll und seine Nachbarn (Peter Schmoll and his Neighbours), an opera by Carl Maria von Weber

Surnames from nicknames